Kadarmapee: Manja Nakada (English: Trick Master) is a 2010 comedy Indian Meitei language film directed by L. Prakash and produced by Kamala Saikhom under the banner of Saikhom Films. It stars Gokul Athokpam, Kamala Saikhom, Uttam Mayanglambam and Bala Hijam in the lead roles. The film was released at Bhagyachandra Open Air Theatre (BOAT), Imphal on 4 November 2010. It was also premiered at Bangalore, Koromangala (Game Village) NGV Club (Bowling Alley Hall) on 14 November 2010.

Synopsis
While escaping from police, Yaima hides in Tamphasana's room. He spends the night in the latter's place. When Yoimayai (Tamphasana's fiancé) discovers this, he tries to chase Yaima away. Nungthil Chaibi, who is tricked by Yoimayai, tries to trap him. Yaima also tries to trick Tamphasana and make her fall for him.

Cast
 Gokul Athokpam as Yaima
 Kamala Saikhom as Rajkumari Tamphasana
 Uttam Mayanglambam as Yoimayai
 Bala Hijam as Nungthil Chaibi
 Takhellambam Lokendra as Tamphasana's father
 Tayenjam Mema as Tamphasana's mother
 Omi as Nungthil Chaibi's father
 Thoudam Ongbi Modhubala as Nungthil Chaibi's mother
 Brajalal as Gouro
 Ngambi as Yaima's aunt
 Keiphah

Soundtrack
Imocha Thiyam wrote the lyrics and Gopi (KOG) and Bobbi Tonjam composed the songs for the movie. Aphao, Eraileima, Mandakini Takhellambam and Uttam Mayanglambam are the playback singers.

References

2010s Meitei-language films
2010 films
Cinema of Manipur